Namazga-Tepe or Namazga-depe, is a Bronze Age (BMAC) archaeological site in Turkmenistan, some 100 km east of Aşgabat, near the border to Iran. Excavated by Vadim Mikhailovich Masson, Viktor Sarianidi, and I. N. Khlopin from the 1950s, the site set the chronology for the Bronze Age sites in Turkmenistan (Namazga III-VI).

Namazga culture was preceded in the area by Jeitun culture.

Chronology
It is believed that Anau culture of Turkmenistan considerably precedes the Namazga culture in the area. Namazga I period (c. 4000–3500 BC), is considered contemporary with Anau IB2 period.

Namazga III (c. 3200-2800) as a village settlement in Late Chalcolithic phase, and Namazga IV (c. 2800–2400 BC) as a proto-urban site, both belong to the Late Regionalization Era.

Namazga V (c. 2400–2000 BC), is in the Integration Era or the period of "urban revolution" following the Anatolian model with little or no irrigation. Namazga-Tepe emerges as the production and probable governmental center, covering some 60 hectares, with Altyndepe likely a secondary capital. Around 1600 BC, Altyndepe is abandoned, and Namazga-Tepe shrinks to a fraction of its former size.

Namazga VI in the Late Bronze Age (c. 1800–1500 BC), as part of the Localization Era is characterized by the incursion of nomadic pastoralists from the Alekseyevka culture and/or Srubna culture.

There have also been detailed painted potteries located at this site.

The following table clarifies the chronology of Namazga culture.

See also
 South Turkmenistan Complex Archaeological Expedition

References

Bibliography

V. M. Masson and V. I. Sarianidi, Central Asia: Turkmenia before the Achaemenids (trans. Tringham, 1972); review: Charles C. Kolb, American Anthropologist (1973), 1945-1948.

External links
Altin Tepe entry in Encyclopaedia Iranica

Tells (archaeology)
Archaeological sites in Turkmenistan
Former populated places in Turkmenistan
Ahal Region